Abdul Hadi Arghandiwal (born 1952) is an Afghan politician and the Head of Hezb-i Islami Afghanistan. He was once allied with Islamist warlord Gulbuddin Hekmatyar, but in 2008 he was elected chairman of a moderate breakaway faction of Hekmatyar's party.

Abdul Hadi Arghandiwal earned a BA in economics, before working at the planning ministry in 1977 and then he went to USA. Back in Afghanistan, he fled from the civil war to Pakistan.

He has served as Minister of Finance in 1996. Arghandiwaal has also served as advisor to President Hamid Karzai over tribal affairs. On January 16, 2010, he was appointed as Minister of Economy by gaining a vote of confidence from the Afghan Parliament. He was again Minister of Finance from March 2020 to January 2021.

References

1952 births
Living people
Hezb-e Islami Gulbuddin politicians
Government ministers of Afghanistan
Afghan expatriates in Pakistan
Finance Ministers of Afghanistan
Economy ministers of Afghanistan